Kimberly (Kim) Jackson (born 22 August 1965, in Dublin) is an Irish singer who was the Irish representative at the 1991 Eurovision Song Contest with the song "Could It Be That I'm In Love" composed by Liam Reilly finishing joint 10th with the UK's Samantha Janus. Jackson had started her early career as backing vocalist with some of Ireland's most successful cabaret groups.

References 

1965 births
Living people
Irish pop singers
Eurovision Song Contest entrants for Ireland
Eurovision Song Contest entrants of 1991